Floyd Mutrux (born June 21, 1941) is an American stage and film director, writer, producer, and screenwriter.

Career 
He began his work in Hollywood as an uncredited writer for Two-Lane Blacktop (1971). His career continued with The Christian Licorice Store (1971; writer/producer), Dusty and Sweets McGee (1971; writer, producer and director) and Freebie and the Bean (1974; story and executive producer). He wrote and directed Aloha, Bobby and Rose (1975) and The Hollywood Knights (1980). Mutrux also directed American Hot Wax (1978). His later work includes Dick Tracy (1990; executive producer), American Me (1992; writer/executive producer), Blood In Blood Out (1993; screenplay), There Goes My Baby (1994; writer/director) and Mulholland Falls (1996; story).

Mutrux co-wrote the musical theater productions Million Dollar Quartet (2010), Baby It's You! (2009). and Heartbreak Hotel, which opened at the Broadway Playhouse in Chicago on June 30, 2018 and closed on September 9, 2018. He and co-writer Colin Escott were nominated for a Tony Award for Million Dollar Quartet.

In the last twenty-five years Mutrux has written and sold over fifty screenplays.

Personal life 
Mutrux studied in New York while working at Second City, Chicago, and later attended Columbia University.

He married Penny Long, with whom he had one son, Ashley, but they later divorced. He is now married to Brigitte Mutrux.

References

External links
Official website

American male screenwriters
1941 births
Living people
American film producers
American film directors
American theatre directors
American musical theatre librettists
American male dramatists and playwrights
American dramatists and playwrights